Peirce Fee Lewis (October 26, 1927 – February 18, 2018) was an American geographer and professor at Pennsylvania State University who has extensively written on the subjects of the American landscape and the cultural geography of America. He served as president of the Association of American Geographers in 1983–1984.

Recognitions
Ellen Churchill Semple award, Department of Geography, University of Kentucky, 1981
Guggenheim Fellowship, 1986

References

Further reading

Peirce Lewis's Axioms for reading the American landscape
New Orleans:The Making of an Urban Landscape

1927 births
2018 deaths
American geographers
Cultural geographers
Pennsylvania State University faculty
Presidents of the American Association of Geographers